The 2004 Kansas Democratic presidential caucuses were held on March 13 in the U.S. state of Kansas as one of the Democratic Party's statewide nomination contests ahead of the 2004 presidential election.

Results

References

Kansas
2004 Kansas elections
2004